Raoul Island (Sunday Island) is the largest and northernmost of the main Kermadec Islands,  south south-west of 'Ata Island of Tonga and  north north-east of New Zealand's North Island. It has been the source of vigorous volcanic activity during the past several thousand years that was dominated by dacitic explosive eruptions.

Although Raoul is the only island in the Kermadec group large enough to support settlement, it lacks a safe harbour, and landings from small boats can be made only in calm weather.

History
Evidence from archaeological sites on the northern coast of Raoul Island indicate that Polynesians settled there in the 14th century. A 1980 publication also suggested a lower layer of deposits dated to the 10th century, but this was rejected by the paper's author in 1991 in favour of the later date. Finds at the sites included stone implements of the Polynesian type, obsidian flakes, shells and charcoal. Obsidian of the same type has been found at early Māori sites at Shag River / Waihemo and Tai Rua, Otago on the South Island of New Zealand. There are also similarities to the Raoul settlement at archaic sites at Houhora and Papatowai. Higham and Johnson (1997) concluded that Raoul was settled from New Zealand but that the Kermadecs were a stepping stone in an early and rapid Polynesian migration from Polynesia to New Zealand and back although the occupation of the islands was relatively brief.

The island was uninhabited when first sighted by Western sailors and was named after Joseph Raoul, quartermaster of the Recherche, when it was sighted on 16 March 1793. Captain William Raven of the whaleship Britannia sighted the island on 6 March 1796 and called it Sunday Island, a name which was subsequently in common usage. Captain Henry Mangles Denham of HMS Herald charted the island in 1854.

The last regular occupants, Tom Bell and his wife Frederica, spent thirty-six years on the island before the New Zealand government evacuated them in 1914. A landing party sent to investigate the island found out how hasty the evacuation of the Bells was – a 1914 calendar was still pinned to the kitchen wall and the family's furniture, cutlery, and child's toys had remained in place. The family arrived with six children and five more were born there.

From 27 May to 16 June 1917, the German raider Wolf, under the command of Korvettenkapitän Karl August Nerger, anchored in the protected bay to undertake engine overhaul and maintenance.  During this period Wolf captured the New Zealand steamship Wairuna (3,950 tons) and the American sailing bark Winslow (570 tons), commandeering all cargo and coal from both ships.

Weather station
The New Zealand government has permanently manned Raoul Island since 1937. It includes a government meteorological and radio station and hostel for Department of Conservation (DOC) officers and volunteers.

The  meteorological station (WMO ID 93997) was initially operated by NZ Post Office staff operating the aeradio station, but shortly after the end of World War 2,  the New Zealand Meteorological Service took over the running of the station, with nine full-time staff.  Each team undertook 12-month expeditions to the island to provide three hourly weather reports and once daily radiosonde flights using hydrogen filled balloons. Weather reports were radioed back to New Zealand using HF radio to ZLW Wellington Radio. 

In addition to its primary purpose as a meteorological station, staff at the station also maintained a seismic monitoring station, made once a week measurements of sea temperature at Fishing Rock and the lake levels and temperatures of Blue and Green Lakes. 

In 1990 the surface weather observation programme was automated and the Dept of Conservation took over responsibility for operational activities on the island. 

Raoul Island Station remains the northernmost outpost of New Zealand.

2006 eruption - Mark Kearney
On 17 March 2006 at 8:21a.m. NZDT, a 40-second long volcanic eruption occurred at the Green Lake. At the time, Mark Kearney, a DOC worker, was at the crater taking water temperature measurements. A  area around Green Lake was affected with ash, mud and boulders. Two DOC workers were forced to turn back after going to the crater to search for Kearney.

Following the eruption, DOC decided to evacuate the remaining five staff members. A Mil Mi-8 helicopter and Piper PA-31 Navajo aircraft took off from Taupō at 11a.m. that morning. They arrived at the island in the late afternoon and undertook a 45-minute search for Kearney but no sign was seen. The evacuated staff members were brought back to Auckland that evening.

A Royal New Zealand Air Force P-3 Orion made an overflight on 21 March to provide further information on how safe it is to approach Green Lake. The volcanologists aboard decided the area was still unsafe, and that the crater lake had risen by about  compared to measurements taken on 17 March. There was no cloud or ash plume.

A group of police, the five evacuated workers, three other DOC staff and scientific staff left Tauranga on 18 March for the three-day boat trip to Raoul aboard the RV Braveheart to recover Kearney's body. They were able to undertake a limited search, but decided that it was extremely unlikely that Kearney survived given the amount of devastation in the area around Green Lake. The Braveheart began the journey back to the mainland on 25 March, with three of the DOC workers staying on the island to continue research. The three were joined by the other four evacuated workers at the start of May 2006. Two of the three will return to the mainland after the handover.

Five hours after the eruption, the Aura satellite passed over and found an estimated  of sulfur dioxide had been released. This confirmed that there were magmatic gases in the eruption, and the presence of degassing magma within the volcano. By the end of April, the activity in the area had decreased significantly and the "Alert Level" was lowered to 1.

HMNZS Te Mana left for Raoul on 24 August 2006 on a resupply mission. Also on board were Kearney's sister, Merryn McDermott; three representatives of the Ngāti Kurī iwi; and Chris Carter, the Minister of Conservation. During a service held on 28 August, the Ngāti Kurī representatives performed a tapu lifting ceremony. A plaque was erected to honour Kearney. Te Mana also allowed some volcanic monitoring to be undertaken using its SH-2G Super Seasprite helicopter. During a dawn flight, sample bottles were filled with crater lake water.

A report by the New Zealand Department of Labour into the death was released on 14 October 2006. It cleared the Department of Conservation and the Institute of Geological and Nuclear Sciences Ltd of any negligence related to the death of Kearney. The report stated that the eruption was unpredictable and there was no indication of imminent seismic activity.

Located on an active margin between two tectonic plates, the Kermadec Islands also experience frequent earthquakes, the most recently significant of which occurred at 19:28:31 UTC on 4 March 2021. The epicentre occurred south of Raoul and measured 8.1 on the moment magnitude scale, and as such is classified as a 'major' earthquake by the United States Geological Survey. Also of note on 31 January 2007 at 4:15:55 NZST a Magnitude 6.5 (Strong) earthquake shook the island. More recently on 22 October 2011 at 05:57:17 NZST a Magnitude 7.4 earthquake originating at 28.941S 176.045W at a depth of 39 km occurred according to the United States Geological Survey.

July 2011 earthquake
7 July 2011 – 7:03am. A 7.6 Magnitude earthquake occurred at a depth of 24 km, 211 km east of Raoul Island. 7 July 2011 – 8:51am Pacific Tsunami Warning Center scientist Barry Hirshorn told Newstalk ZB the quake generated a 1.9 metre tsunami at Raoul Island.

October 2011 earthquake

22 October 2011 – 5:57pm.

The Ministry of Civil Defence had issued the advisory while it assessed the severity of the threat to New Zealand. The Ministry was warning people in coastal areas to stay off beaches and out of the water. People were advised to avoid sightseeing and remain on alert in case the earthquake has generated a tsunami, however by mid-morning warnings had lifted.

2012 - Mihai Muncus-Nagy 

Department of Conservation volunteer Mihai Muncus-Nagy, a 33-year-old biologist from Romania, went missing on Raoul Island on 2 January 2012. He went to Raoul at the end of October 2011.  His vehicle and gear were found close to where he was carrying out water temperature readings on the morning of 2 January 2012.

The remaining staff and volunteers searched the shore, but did not find any further signs of him.  A helicopter was sent to Raoul by the Rescue Coordination Centre New Zealand (RCCNZ) from Taupō to carry out an aerial search. A DOC boat was also used in the search.

Muncus-Nagy was presumed drowned. Auckland District Court found the Department of Conservation culpable in his death for failing to ensure his safety.

March 2021 earthquake

4 March 2021 – 08:28 local time. Owing to the COVID-19 pandemic, the island was uninhabited at the time. The earthquake led to a tsunami warning for much of New Zealand, and evacuation of some coastal regions of the North Island.

Geography

Two Holocene calderas are found at Raoul. Its long axis is parallel to the tectonic fabric of the Havre Trough that lies west of the volcanic arc.

Historical eruptions at Raoul during the 19th and 20th centuries have sometimes occurred simultaneously from both calderas, and have consisted of small-to-moderate phreatic eruptions, some of which formed ephemeral islands in Denham caldera.

The Denham caldera was named for the nearby Denham Bay, itself named by Royal Navy Captain Henry Mangles Denham in HMS Herald, who came to complete a (chart) survey of the island on 2 July 1854. His son Fleetwood James Denham (16yrs) died from a tropical fever, and was buried near the beach at the head of Denham Bay, where a number of the grass-grown graves of former settlers were. The brass plaque heading this grave has been preserved.

Three small lakes, Blue Lake (about 40% overgrown), Green Lake and Tui Lake (drinking water quality) are located in the northern caldera of Raoul Island. The floor of the caldera surrounding the lakes are called Pumice Flats.

Climate
Raoul Island has a humid subtropical climate close to the border of tropical climate  (Cfa). On February 12, 2022, the minimum temperature in the Raoul Island was 25.6 °C, this is the highest minimum temperature ever recorded in New Zealand.

Flora and fauna

The scientific categorisation of the flora and fauna of the island began in 1854 when , captained by Henry Mangles Denham, arrived to complete the charting of the island. He arrived on the 2nd and was occupied till 24 July, during which time he frequently had to move the ship on account of the rough weather experienced. William Grant Milne and John MacGillivray, naturalists on board the Herald, made a small collection of plants on Raoul. This was forwarded by Captain Denham to Sir W. Hooker, and was described by Sir Joseph Hooker in the Journal of the Linnean Society for 1857.

A scientific expedition was undertaken by a group of naturalists to the Kermadec Islands in 1908. The expedition established its base at Denham Bay. During that expedition one of the naturalists, W. L. Wallace, discovered numerous new insect species including the beetle Saprosites raoulensis.

Raoul is part of the Kermadec Islands subtropical moist forests ecoregion and is largely covered with closed-canopy forest, predominantly of the evergreen Kermadec pōhutukawa (Metrosideros kermadecensis) and the Kermadec nikau palm (Rhopalostylis baueri, formerly described as Rhopalostylis cheesemanii). It is just far enough south that the occasional fertile coconut from Polynesia that washes up on shore and takes root will not survive in the longterm due to a lack of warmth. The island has no native land mammals and was formerly home to vast colonies of seabirds who nested in the forests. The islands may once have had a species of megapode (based on early settler records) and a subspecies of kererū. Currently native landbirds on the island include the Kermadec red-crowned parakeet (Cyanoramphus novaezelandiae cyanurus), the Australasian harrier, pūkeko, tūī and several introduced species. The island forms part of the Kermadec Islands Important Bird Area, identified as such by BirdLife International because it is an important site for nesting seabirds.

Polynesian visitors introduced the Polynesian rat in the 14th century and Norway rats, cats and goats were introduced by European and American visitors in the 19th and 20th centuries. The rats and cats greatly reduced the seabird colonies, which mostly withdrew to offshore islets, and exterminated the red-crowned parakeet, the last confirmed record of resident parakeets for over a century being made in 1836. Although the goats did not eliminate the tree canopy as they did on other islands, they greatly reduced the understorey vegetation and were removed in 1986. The parakeets had been absent from the island for 150 years and their natural return was a notable event in parrot conservation.

There are numerous invasive plant species on the island and a large scale weeding programme involving teams of DOC workers and volunteers has been under way for a number of years in an attempt to eradicate them. Myrtle Rust has been found on the island in 2017.

The island is part of the Kermadec Islands Marine Reserve, New Zealand's largest marine reserve, which was created in 1990.

Satellite islands and rocks
The two largest satellite islands are North Island and South Island of Meyer Islands.
	Islands and rocks in the northeast of Raoul Island
	Fishing Rock
	Egeria Rock
	Meyer Islands
     North Island
     South Island
	Napier
	Nugent Island (northernmost island of New Zealand)
	Herald Islets
	Dayrell Island
	Chanter Islands
	Chanter (North) Island
	South Island
	West Island
	Islands and rocks in the southwest of Raoul Island
	Milne Islands
	Dougall Rocks

See also

 New Zealand outlying islands
 List of earthquakes in New Zealand
 List of volcanoes in New Zealand
 List of islands of New Zealand
 List of islands
 List of recently extinct bird species
 Desert island

References

Further reading
 Oliver, R., 'The Vegetation of the Kermadec Islands'. Transactions and Proceedings of the Royal Society of New Zealand, Volume 42, 1909, p. 121. URL: RSNZ, accessed 3 January 2007.
 Polynesian stone implements

External links

A visit to Raoul in 2002 by Dr. Floor Anthoni
A history of the Bell family who lived on Raoul/Sunday Island from 1878 to 1914
Kermadec Islands Marine Reserve (New Zealand Department of Conservation)
Raoul Island volcano webcam and seismic information 
LINZ – highly detailed map

 
Stratovolcanoes of New Zealand
Active volcanoes
Islands of the Kermadec Islands
VEI-6 volcanoes
Calderas of New Zealand
Submarine calderas
Island restoration
Uninhabited islands of New Zealand
Important Bird Areas of the Kermadec Islands
Volcanic islands of New Zealand
Volcanoes of the New Zealand outlying islands
Holocene calderas